Thomas Earl Robinson (born March 17, 1991) is an American-born naturalised Lebanese professional basketball player for Real Estelí of the Liga Superior de Baloncesto. A consensus All-American at the University of Kansas, Robinson was drafted fifth overall in the 2012 NBA draft by the Sacramento Kings.

High school career
Robinson played high school basketball at Brewster Academy in Wolfeboro, New Hampshire. Robinson averaged 16 points, 13 rebounds and 5 blocks per game his senior year.

Robinson was ranked as the No. 24 recruit by Scout.com, No. 31 by Rivals.com and No. 40 by ESPN.com as a high school senior.

|}

College career

Robinson began his junior year and the 2011–2012 men's college basketball season as one of 50 candidates for the preseason John R. Wooden Award. Along with senior teammate Tyshawn Taylor, Robinson was expected to become one of the leaders for the Kansas team.

On December 31, 2011, in a game against the University of North Dakota, Robinson scored 30 points and grabbed 21 rebounds. He was the first Kansas player to record a 30/20 performance since Wayne Hightower scored 36 points and grabbed 21 rebounds in a 1961 game against the University of Missouri. At the end of the Big 12 conference regular season, Robinson was second in the nation with 22 double doubles behind O.D. Anosike of Siena College. At that point, Robinson averaged 18 points and 11.9 rebounds.

Prior to their game on January 22, 2011, against Texas, Kansas players, coaches and fans held a moment of silence in honor of Robinson, who had lost his grandmother, grandfather, and mother all within three weeks of one another. After the game, Kansas coach Bill Self said "For him to even be out there on the court was remarkable."

On March 4, 2012, Robinson was named the 2012 Big 12 Player of the Year. All-Big 12 awards are selected by the league's head coaches. On March 5, 2012, he was named the Associated Press Big 12 Player of the Year.

On April 9, 2012, Robinson decided to forgo his senior season and declared for the 2012 NBA draft.

College statistics

|-
|style="text-align:left;"|2009–10
|style="text-align:left;"|Kansas
|33||1||7.2||.485||.000||.395||2.7||.3||.2||.5||2.5
|-
|style="text-align:left;"|2010–11
|style="text-align:left;"|Kansas
|33||2||14.6||.601||.000||.510||6.4||.6||.4||.7||7.6
|-
|style="text-align:left;"|2011–12
|style="text-align:left;"|Kansas
|39||39||31.8||.505||.500||.682||11.9||1.8||1.1||.9||17.7
|- class="sortbottom"
| style="text-align:center;" colspan="2"| Career
|105||42||18.7||.525||.500||.606||7.3||1.0||.6||.7||9.8

College awards and honors
 Consensus first-team All-American (2012)
 NCAA Final Four All-Tournament Team (2012)
Big 12 Conference Player of the Year (2012)
 First team All-Big 12 (2012)
ESPN.com National Player of the Year (2012)
John R. Wooden Award Finalist (2012)
Naismith College Player of the Year Finalist (2012)

Professional career

Sacramento Kings (2012–2013)
On June 28, 2012, Robinson was drafted fifth overall in the 2012 NBA draft by the Sacramento Kings. On November 7, 2012, in the fourth quarter of a game against the Detroit Pistons, Robinson hit Jonas Jerebko in the throat with an elbow, and was ejected from the game. The following day, he was suspended for two games.

Houston Rockets (2013)
On February 21, 2013, Robinson was traded, along with Francisco García and Tyler Honeycutt, to the Houston Rockets in exchange for Patrick Patterson, Toney Douglas, and Cole Aldrich and cash considerations., Robinson was given up on by the Kings with DeMarcus Cousins emergence and their overload in the front court was traded in the middle of his rookie season to the Rockets .

Portland Trail Blazers (2013–2015)
On July 10, 2013, Robinson was traded to the Portland Trail Blazers in exchange for the rights to Kostas Papanikolaou and Marko Todorović, as well as two future second-round picks. On February 23, 2014, Robinson recorded 14 points and a career-high 18 rebounds in a 108–97 win over the Minnesota Timberwolves. In 2013–14, he averaged 4.8 points and 4.4 rebounds in 70 games.

The 2014–15 season saw Robinson consigned to the bench, buried on the depth chart by the team's off-season addition of former All-Star big man Chris Kaman. Robinson's first real opportunity of the season came with the injury of starting center Robin Lopez, who fractured his right hand on December 15 in a win over the San Antonio Spurs. Robinson made his first NBA start in the team's next game, a December 17 home contest against the Milwaukee Bucks, racking up 15 points and 16 rebounds to help the Trail Blazers win 104–97. He became the third Blazers player to put up at least 15 points and 15 rebounds in his first start; the other two being Bill Walton and Maurice Lucas. In subsequent games, Robinson was paired with Kaman off the bench, playing solid reserve minutes as power forward behind LaMarcus Aldridge.

Philadelphia 76ers (2015)
On February 19, 2015, Robinson was traded, along with Will Barton, Víctor Claver and a lottery-protected 2016 first-round pick, to the Denver Nuggets in exchange for Arron Afflalo and Alonzo Gee. Three days later, he was waived by the Nuggets before playing in a game for them.

On February 24, 2015, Robinson was claimed off waivers by the Philadelphia 76ers. The next day, he made his debut for the 76ers, recording seven points and six rebounds in a 104–88 loss to the Milwaukee Bucks.

Brooklyn Nets (2015–2016)
On July 9, 2015, Robinson signed with the Brooklyn Nets. He made his debut for the Nets in the team's season opener against the Chicago Bulls on October 28, recording four points and five rebounds off the bench in a 115–100 loss. On March 5, 2016, he had a season-best game with 18 points and 17 rebounds in 40 minutes as a starter in a 132–118 loss to the Minnesota Timberwolves. On March 29, he made just his second start of the season and again scored 18 points, this time in a loss to Orlando Magic. On April 3, he recorded his fourth straight double-double with 11 points and 15 rebounds in a 106–87 loss to the New Orleans Pelicans.

Los Angeles Lakers (2016–2017)
On September 21, 2016, Robinson signed with the Los Angeles Lakers. On March 21, 2017, Robinson scored a season-high 16 points in a 133–109 loss to the Los Angeles Clippers. He tied that mark on April 1, 2017, recording 16 points and nine rebounds in another loss to the Clippers. A day later, Robinson recorded his first double-double of the season with 12 points and 10 rebounds in a 108–103 win over the Memphis Grizzlies.

Khimki (2017–2018)
On September 23, 2017, Robinson signed with Russian club Khimki for the 2017–18 season.

On August 30, 2018, Robinson signed with the Atlanta Hawks. On October 13, 2018, Robinson was waived by the Hawks.

Beikong Fly Dragons (2018–2019)
On December 3, 2018, Robinson signed with Chinese club Beikong Fly Dragons.

Maine Red Claws (2019)
On March 17, 2019, the Maine Red Claws of the NBA G League announced via Twitter that they had acquired Robinson off waivers.

Khimki (2020)
On February 6, 2020, Robinson returned to his former Russian club Khimki of the VTB United League and the EuroLeague, signing a one-month contract with an option to renew for the rest of the season. He averaged 4.2 points and 3.2 rebounds per game in four EuroLeague games. Robinson parted ways with the team on August 4.

Bahçeşehir Koleji (2020–2021)
On November 25, 2020, Robinson signed with Bahçeşehir Koleji of the Turkish Basketball Super League (BSL).

Cangrejeros de Santurce (2021)
On May 28, 2021, Cangrejeros de Santurce announced that they had added Robinson to their roster.

Seoul Samsung Thunders (2021–2022)
On November 28, 2021, Robinson signed with Seoul Samsung Thunders of the Korean Basketball League.

Piratas de Quebradillas (2022)
On February 16, 2022, Robinson returned to Puerto Rico, this time signing with Piratas de Quebradillas.

In August 2022, he signed with the San Miguel Beermen of the Philippine Basketball Association (PBA) as the team's import for the 2022–23 PBA Commissioner's Cup. However, he was replaced prior to playing a game with the team due to injury.

Career statistics

NBA

Regular season

|-
| align="left" | 
| align="left" | Sacramento
| 51 || 0 || 15.9|| .424 || .000 || .577 || 4.7 || .7 || .5 || .4 || 4.8
|-
| align="left" | 
| align="left" | Houston
| 19 || 0 || 13.0 || .449 || .000 || .421 || 4.1 || .5 || .8 || .3 || 4.5
|-
| align="left" | 
| align="left" | Portland
| 70 || 0 || 12.5 || .481 || .000 || .564 || 4.4 || .5 || .3 || .3 || 4.8
|-
| align="left" | 
| align="left" | Portland
| 32 || 4 || 12.2 || .516 || .000 || .438 || 4.2 || .3 || .5 || .3 || 3.6
|-
| align="left" | 
| align="left" | Philadelphia
| 22 || 0 || 18.5  || .467 || .000 || .603  || 7.7 || 1.1 || .7 || .7 || 8.8
|-
| align="left" | 
| align="left" | Brooklyn
| 71 || 7 || 12.9 || .447 || .000 || .431 || 5.1 || .6 || .5 || .5 || 4.3
|-
| align="left" | 
| align="left" | L.A. Lakers
| 48 || 1 || 11.7 || .536 || .000 || .470 || 4.6 || .6 || .5 || .2 || 5.0
|- class="sortbottom"
| align="center" colspan="2" | Career
| 313 || 12 || 13.4 || .470 || .000 || .505 || 4.8 || .6 || .5 || .4 || 4.9

Playoffs

|-
| align="left" | 2014
| align="left" | Portland
| 11 || 0 || 11.1 || .419 || .000 || .857 || 2.6 || .5 || .5 || .5 || 2.9
|- class="sortbottom"
| align="center" colspan="2" | Career
| 11 || 0 || 11.1 || .419 || .000 || .857 || 2.6 || .5 || .5 || .5 || 2.9

NBA G League

|-
| align="left" | 2018–19
| align="left" | Maine
| 4 || 0 || 26.5 || .585 || .250 || .684 || 13.5 || 1.5 || 1.3 || 1.0 || 19.0
|-
| align="left" | Career
| align="left" | 
| 4 || 0 || 26.5 || .585 || .250 || .684 || 13.5 || 1.5 || 1.3 || 1.0 || 19.0

EuroLeague

|-
| align="left" | 2017–18
| align="left" | Khimki
| 20 || 1 || 15.6 || .486 || .000 || .417 || 5.8 || .4 || .7 || .6 || 8.2 || 9.1
|- class="sortbottom"
| align="center" colspan="2" | Career
| 20 || 1 || 15.6 || .486 || .000 || .417 || 5.8 || .4 || .7 || .6 || 8.2 || 9.1

National team career
After receiving a Lebanese passport in December 2021, Robinson joined the Lebanon national basketball team.

Personal life
Thomas lost his grandmother, grandfather, and mother within three weeks while in college. He has a younger sister named Jayla Paris who was born in 2003 and an older brother named Jamal Robinson. 

After the deaths of Robinson's mother and grandparents, Angel Morris, the mother of NBA twins  Marcus  and Markieff Morris, took care of both Thomas and his younger sister.

Robinson is the co-founder  of the Family Over Everything Foundation (F.O.E) alongside the Morris twins and their mother.

Robinson is engaged to Kai Cyre Craig, a nurse and famous Instagram model. Together, they have a daughter and a son named Rain and Ryder Robinson  

In December 2021, Robinson received a Lebanese passport.

References

External links

 Thomas Robinson G League Stats
 Kansas Jayhawks bio
 Thomas Robinson at euroleague.net

1991 births
Living people
21st-century African-American sportspeople
African-American basketball players
All-American college men's basketball players
American expatriate basketball people in China
American expatriate basketball people in Russia
American expatriate basketball people in South Korea
American expatriate basketball people in Turkey
American men's basketball players
Bahçeşehir Koleji S.K. players
Basketball players from Washington, D.C.
BC Khimki players
Beijing Royal Fighters players
Brewster Academy alumni
Brooklyn Nets players
Houston Rockets players
Kansas Jayhawks men's basketball players
Lebanese men's basketball players
Los Angeles Lakers players
Maine Red Claws players
Parade High School All-Americans (boys' basketball)
Philadelphia 76ers players
Piratas de Quebradillas players
Portland Trail Blazers players
Power forwards (basketball)
Sacramento Kings draft picks
Sacramento Kings players
Seoul Samsung Thunders players
Sichuan Blue Whales players